The African Journal of Marine Science is a peer-reviewed scientific journal covering all disciplines of marine science. It was established in 1983 as the South African Journal of Marine Science and obtained its current name in 2003. It is published by Taylor & Francis on behalf of the National Inquiry Services Centre (South Africa). The editor-in-chief is Sheldon Dudley (Department of Agriculture, Forestry and Fisheries).

Abstracting and indexing
The journal is abstracted and indexed in:

According to the Journal Citation Reports, the journal has a 2020 impact factor of 1.183.

References

External links

Journal page at the National Inquiry Services Centre

Oceanography journals
Publications established in 1983
Quarterly journals
English-language journals
Taylor & Francis academic journals
Academic journals published in South Africa